The 2020–21 Cairns Taipans season was the 22nd season for the Cairns Taipans in the NBL, and their third and final season under the guidance of Head Coach Mike Kelly.

Season summary

After a successful campaign the season prior, the Taipans faced an early setback when it was announced that the redevelopment of the Cairns Convention Centre had been delayed and was unavailable for use until early February 2020, two months after the NBL announced the delayed season would start. After meeting with the Queensland Minister for Housing, Public Works and Sports Mick de Brenni, it was announced that the redevelopment timeline would not be adjusted for the Taipans. Following more discussions between the club and the state government, it was announced that the government would redevelop an old warehouse capable to host games across the two month period between the start of the season and when the Convention Centre becomes available, with the temporary stadium able to hold 2,000 seats.

Squad

Signings 

 The Taipans only retained one of their players over the off-season, Majok Deng, who had signed a multiple season contract before the 2019–20 season. Head Coach Mike Kelly had also already signed for the 2020–21 season.
 On 13 March 2020, Mojave King was signed as a Next Star player. King signed with the Taipans on a three-year deal as part of the Next Stars program, which "contracts Draft eligible players in order to prepare and fast-track them to the NBA, providing an alternative option to attending college."
 On 7 March 2020, the Taipans announced that they'd taken the club option on the contracts of Mirko Djeric, Fabijan Krslovic and Kouat Noi, who would all return to Cairns on a one-year deal.
 On 3 August 2020, the Taipans re-signed co-captain Nathan Jawai on an two-year deal, extending his stint at the club to at least seven years.
 On 6 August 2020, Jarrod Kenny joined the list of returning Taipans and signed a one-season deal with the club.
 On 14 August 2020, the Taipans signed Jordan Ngatai to a two-year deal.
 On 3 September 2020, George Blagojevic re-signed with the club on a two-year deal (with the second year being a club option).
 On 16 November 2020, Cameron Oliver re-signed with the Snakes on a two-year deal, signing as the team's first import for the 2020–21 season,
 On 22 November 2020, Scott Machado completed the Taipans' roster by also signing a two-year deal.
 On 22 December 2020, Jordan Hunt was announced as the Taipans only development player for the season. Tad Dufelmeier and Koen Sapwell were also announced as the training players for the club. Dufelmeier would later be promoted to the playing roster to cover the injury of Deng.
 After both Deng and Noi were injured throughout the season, on 2 April 2021, Hyrum Harris was signed as a nominated injury player.
 On 18 April 2020, Oliver's contract was waived for the season to allow him to return home to the U.S. to support his wife during her pregnancy.
 On 20 April 2020, Venky Jois was signed for the remainder of the season.
 On 30 May 2021, the Taipans announced that Head Coach Kelly wouldn't be returning to the club for the final year of his contract.

Roster

Depth chart

Pre-season

Ladder

Game log

December

January

Regular season

Ladder

Game log

Round 1

Round 2

Round 3

Round 4

NBL Cup

Round 6

Round 7

Round 8

Round 9

Round 10

Round 11

Round 12

Round 13

Round 14

Round 15

Round 16

Round 17

Round 18

Round 19

Round 20

Round 21

Awards

Regular season

Player of the Week
Round 4, Scott Machado 

Round 14, Cameron Oliver

MVP
Round 1, vs Sydney Kings: Scott Machado

Round 4, vs New Zealand Breakers: Majok Deng

Round 6, vs Illawarra Hawks: Scott Machado

Round 8, vs Sydney Kings: Nathan Jawai

Round 11, vs Adelaide 36ers: Cameron Oliver

Round 14, vs Adelaide 36ers: Cameron Oliver

Round 15, @ New Zealand Breakers: Nathan Jawai

Round 20, @ South East Melbourne Phoenix: Mirko Djeric

See also
2020–21 NBL season
Cairns Taipans

References

External links
 Official Website
 Team Statistics

Cairns Taipans season
Cairns Taipans season
Cairns Taipans seasons
Cairns Taipans